Friedrich-Wilhelm Müller (1897–1947) was a German Wehrmacht general of the infantry. General Müller or Muller may also refer to:

Alfred Müller (general) (1915–1997), German Wehrmacht brigadier general
Bernhard Müller (general) (born 1957), Swiss Air Force divisional general
Dietrich von Müller (1891–1961), German Wehrmacht lieutenant general
Eugen Müller (1891–1951), German Wehrmacht general of artillery
François Muller (1764–1808), French Royal Army general of brigade and general of division
Gotthold Müller (1795–1882), Danish major general
Gottlob Müller (1895–1945), German Luftwaffe lieutenant general
Heinrich Müller (Gestapo) (1900–c. 1945), German Schutzstaffel general
Henry J. Muller (CERDEC) (fl. 1980s–2010s), U.S. Army general
Henry J. Muller (born 1917), U.S. Army brigadier general
Jacques Léonard Muller (1749–1824), French Army general of division
Ludwig Müller (general) (1892–1972), German Wehrmacht general of the infantry
Michal Muller (born 1930), South African Army lieutenant general
Richard Müller (general) (1891–1943), German Wehrmacht lieutenant general
Vincenz Müller (1894–1961), East German National People's Army lieutenant general

See also
Philipp Müller-Gebhard (1889–1970), German Wehrmacht lieutenant general
Desmond Mueller (born 1943), Australian Army lieutenant general
Paul J. Mueller (1892–1964), U.S. Army major general